The Noid is an advertising character for Domino's Pizza created in the 1980s and revived in 2021. Clad in a red, skin-tight, rabbit-eared body suit with a black N inscribed in a white circle on his chest, the Noid was a physical manifestation of all the challenges inherent in getting a pizza delivered in 30 minutes or less. Though persistent, his efforts were repeatedly thwarted.

History
The Noid was created in 1986 by Group 243, the advertising agency of record for Domino's Pizza. Group 243 hired Will Vinton Studios to sketch the Noid and animate the commercials. Commercials that featured the character used the slogan "Avoid the Noid". The Noid's vocal effects were provided by Pons Maar. Most of the commercials featuring the Noid were narrated by Andre Stojka.

In 1988, a Saturday morning cartoon series called The Noids was planned by CBS that would have featured the Noid, but the series was scrapped amid complaints that it was merely an advertising ploy and not a show for children.

As part of the advertising campaign, a computer game was released in 1989 called Avoid the Noid. The object of the game is to deliver a pizza within a half-hour time limit in an apartment building swarming with Noids (some of which are armed with pizza-seeking missiles or water balloons). In 1990, Capcom released a platformer game, Yo! Noid, for the NES.

Chamblee hostage incident
On January 30, 1989, Kenneth Lamar Noid, a mentally ill man who believed that the "Avoid the Noid" campaign was personally directed towards him and was antagonizing him, entered a Domino's restaurant in Chamblee, Georgia. Armed with a .357 Magnum, Noid then held two employees hostage for over five hours. 

After ranting to the employees that the then-owner of Domino's, Tom Monaghan, was fraudulent and had stolen his name, he first forced them to call the Domino's headquarters to demand $100,000 and a white limousine as getaway transportation for him. After offering to exchange a hostage for a copy of American postmodern author Robert Anton Wilson's 1985 novel The Widow's Son, Noid reneged on his offer when an officer brought him the book. Noid then became hungry and forced the captive employees to make him two pizzas; while Noid ate the pizzas with his gun in his lap, the hostages escaped. Noid surrendered to the police shortly after. Two shots were fired by Noid during the incident.

Noid was charged with kidnapping, aggravated assault, extortion, and possession of a firearm during a crime. He was found not guilty by reason of insanity. Noid subsequently spent time in a mental institution, but died by suicide on February 23, 1995. This incident was widely believed to have caused Domino's Pizza to discontinue advertising using the Noid as their mascot, but this claim has been rejected by the company and their advertisers.

Recurrences of The Noid 
Domino's brought the Noid back for a limited run of 1,000 T-shirts in December 2009.
On May 4, 2011, the Noid was brought back as a promotional figure by Domino's to be used in a campaign on their Facebook page, and made a brief appearance as a stuffed toy at the end of a May 2011 commercial promoting a one-topping pizza deal. The 25th birthday of the Noid mascot was marked with the video game The Noid's Super Pizza Shootout, a tribute to Avoid the Noid.

In June 2016, Spooky Pinball LLC announced the release of their new licensed pinball machine, Domino's Spectacular Pinball Adventure prominently featuring the Noid character.

During 2016, the Noid appeared and was referenced in some Domino's commercials, as part of their USA "Pizza Payback" campaign.

The Noid was seen tattooed on the arm of a winner of shares of Domino's stock, in a commercial aired during the NFL playoffs, January 15, 2017.

In August 2017, a fan-made sequel to Yo! Noid was created for the New Jam City 2017 game jam called Yo! Noid 2: Enter the Void.

The Noid can be seen briefly in the background of a 2017 Domino's ad.

The Noid returned to television in April 2021. The character first appeared in a series of brief video ads on social media sites, in which the Noid's face could be seen in a disruptive flash of video glitches over a shot of a meal included in a coupon promotion. Domino's officially confirmed the return of the Noid later in the month, and he was subsequently included in the mobile game Crash Bandicoot: On the Run! as part of a tie-in promotion for the restaurant.

In popular culture
The Noid has been referred to in popular culture, including two episodes of Family Guy (an altercation with Mayor Adam West in the episode "Deep Throats" and vomiting into a toilet while Bill Cosby holds his ears in the episode "Peter's Sister"), in two episodes of 30 Rock, an episode of The Simpsons and in a segment of Michael Jackson: Moonwalker.

The Noid has also been referenced in Pizza Tower, a 2023 platform game created by indie developers Tour De Pizza, in the form of The Noise, one of the minor antagonists and bosses in the game.

References

American mascots
Domino's Pizza
Cartoon mascots
Mascots introduced in 1986
Male characters in advertising
Fictional humanoids
Fast food advertising characters
Stop motion characters